Chhindgarh is a Tehsil headquarters in the District of Sukma of Chhattisgarh, India. Chhindgarh is located on the Jagdalpur - Hyderabad road.

References

Cities and towns in Sukma district